Adam and Eva is a 1923 American comedy silent film directed by Robert G. Vignola and adapted by Luther Reed from the play by Guy Bolton and George Middleton. The film stars Marion Davies, T. Roy Barnes, Tom Lewis, William Norris, Percy Ames, Leon Gordon, and Luella Gear. Marion Davies plays an extravagant girl who, when her father goes bust, reforms by learning the simple life and making a farm a thriving business venture. The film was released on February 11, 1923, by Paramount Pictures.

Plot
As described in a film magazine, Eva (Davies), daughter of millionaire James King (Lewis), spends money wastefully and enjoys life wonderfully. Her elder sister Julie (Gear) and her husband Clinton Dewitt (Gordon) live in the King mansion, content to share the wealthy man's fortunes. Among Eva's admirers are Dr. Delamater (Davidson) and Lord Andrew Gordon (Ames), each financially weak and desiring a rich wife. Old James is nearly driven mad by his daughter's extravagances. His South American representative Adam Smith (Barnes) comes to New York City to see him. James suddenly announces that he will go to South America for a few months and leave Adam in charge of his family and the Gotham City business interests. While James is gone, Adam falls in love with Eva but is unable to curb her spendthrift ways until he comes up with the idea of declaring that her father is ruined, which brings matters to a climax. Confronted by poverty, Eva rises to the occasion and makes her sister go to work as well as her Uncle Horace (Norris), and goes to live on a farm belonging to her father. There, with her sister and aided by Adam, she proceeds to raise eggs and honey for the markets. The family works hard. One day James returns to be stunned with the news that his previously ne'er-do-wells have turned over a new leaf and are making good. When the family learns the truth about James, they do not regret the lesson they have learned.

Cast
Marion Davies as Eva King
T. Roy Barnes as Adam Smith, The Salesman-Hero
Tom Lewis as James King
William Norris as Uncle Horace
Percy Ames as Lord Andrew Gordon
Leon Gordon as Clinton Dewitt
Luella Gear as Julie Dewitt
William B. Davidson as Dr. Delamater
Edward Douglas as Lord Andrew's
Bradley Barker as Eve's Admirer
John Powers as Eve's Admirer
Horace James as Gardener

Production
In her 16th film, Marion Davies stars as a spendthrift in a film that was mostly shot on location in Stamford, Connecticut. One sequence was set in Venice, Italy, and one magazine article said, "A little bit of Venice with its winding canals and its picturesque gondolas was transported to the hills of Connecticut...." The Venetian sets were designed by Joseph Urban. The film was a hit at the box office.

Survival status
Adam and Eva survives only as a fragment with only reel number 5 held by the Library of Congress.

References

External links

1923 films
Films shot in Connecticut
Silent American comedy films
1923 comedy films
Paramount Pictures films
Films directed by Robert G. Vignola
American black-and-white films
American silent feature films
1920s American films